Björn Forslund may refer to:
 Björn Forslund (sailor)
 Björn Forslund (speed skater)